Karl A. Rhoads (born January 24, 1963) is an American politician, lawyer and a Democratic member of the Hawaii Senate since 2016 representing District 13. Rhoads previously served consecutively from 2013 to 2016 representing District 29 in the Hawaii House of Representatives and from January 2007 to 2013 in the District 28 seat.

Education and career
Rhoads earned his BA in chemistry and history at Andrews University, his MA at the University of London, and his JD from George Washington University. Rhoads was a summer clerk for Corinne Watanabe on the Intermediate Court of Appeals in 1985.

Elections
2012 Redistricted to District 29, and with Democratic Representative Joey Manahan running for Honolulu City Council, Rhoads won the August 11, 2012 Democratic Primary with 1,604 votes, and was unopposed for the November 6, 2012 General election.
2006 When Democratic Representative Ken Hiraki retired and left the District 28 seat open, Rhoads won the three-way September 26, 2006 Democratic Primary with 1,920 votes (59.4%), and won the November 7, 2006 General election with 2,547 votes (49.9%) against Republican nominee Collin Wong.
2008 Rhoads was unopposed for both the September 20, 2008 Democratic Primary, winning with 1,812 votes, and the November 4, 2008 General election.
2010 Rhoads was unopposed for the September 18, 2010 Democratic Primary, winning with 2,686 votes, and won the November 2, 2010 General election with 3,203 votes (52.3%) against Republican nominee David Chang.

References

External links
Official page at the Hawaii State Legislature
Campaign site
 

Place of birth missing (living people)
1963 births
Living people
Alumni of the University of London
Andrews University alumni
George Washington University Law School alumni
Hawaii lawyers
Democratic Party members of the Hawaii House of Representatives
21st-century American politicians